Humphrey Mainprice (27 November 1882 – 24 November 1958) was an English first-class cricketer. He played 15 first-class matches for Gloucestershire and Cambridge University between 1905 and 1906.

References

1882 births
1958 deaths
English cricketers
Gloucestershire cricketers
Cambridge University cricketers
Cricketers from Cheshire